Barbara Slavin (born 1951) is an American journalist and foreign policy expert. She is a Distinguished Fellow at The Stimson Center and former director of the Future of Iran Initiative at the Atlantic Council's South Asia Center.

Early life
Barbara Slavin graduated from Harvard University, where she earned a Bachelor of Arts degree in Russian language and literature.

Career
Slavin was an assistant Managing Editor for World and National Security at The Washington Times, an editor of the Week in Review in The New York Times, and a correspondent for The Economist in Cairo, Egypt, and Senior Diplomatic Reporter for USA Today. She has also written for Business Week, Newsday, and The Los Angeles Times. She was a Washington correspondent for Al-Monitor. 

In June–August 2006 Slavin was a scholar at the Woodrow Wilson International Center for Scholars. She was also a senior fellow at the United States Institute of Peace. She also authored the book Bitter Friends, Bosom Enemies.

In an article for the Lowy Institute for International Policy in January 2017, Slavin described President Donald Trump as "a neophyte populist politician whose promise to 'make America great again' is based on a deeply pessimistic view of the American status quo and the world order." She added, "Our new president has a lot to learn and has shown a limited capacity to evolve."

In December 2022 The Future of Iran Initiative concluded its efforts and Slavin left her position as director.

Works

References

External links

Living people
1951 births
Harvard University alumni
American women journalists
21st-century American women